Clear Water Academy is a private university preparatory school managed by the Legion of Christ which is located in Calgary, Alberta. It is one of the few private Catholic schools in Alberta, and is dedicated to its four pillars for Catholic formation: Intellectual Formation, Character Formation, Apostolic Formation, and Spiritual Formation. Clear Water runs from Pre-Kindergarten to Grade Twelve, with Grades 4 through 9 being gender separated for all classes. High school is gender separated for selected classes, such as religion and physical education. All students are required to wear a uniform.

History

Clear Water Academy was founded in 1995 with 24 students and two teachers, located in a rented downtown office. From there, Clear Water Academy continued to grow steadily. At the present, Clear Water houses over 400 students and 42 staff in three buildings located in CFB Calgary. Construction of a new building for the school began in 2018. The new building was completed in 2020 for use in the 2020–2021 school year.

Academics

Clear Water Academy offers all regular classes taught at most schools, from Science, to English, to Social Studies, to French. They also teach Spanish, rare among schools in Canada. Options include art and drama and, in grade 11–12, the option of either Physical Education 20 and 30, or Physics 20 and 30.
In 2011, Clear Water Academy was ranked number 1 elementary school in Alberta by the Fraser Institute in the 2011 report, based on Provincial Achievement Test marks for students in grades 3 and 6.
Click here for the 2011 Rankings.2011 Fraser Institute Rankings 
The school ranked 1st place in 2006 as well. In 2019, Clear Water Academy ranked 9th best elementary school in Alberta by the Fraser Institute. The schools high school program wasn't listed in the report. Click here for the 2019 Rankings. 2019 Fraser Institute Rankings

Athletics

Clear Water Academy competes with other private schools in the City of Calgary in most major sports, including volleyball, basketball, soccer, track and field, cross country running, golf, and badminton.  Outdoor Education is a course offered at Clear Water from grades 7-10, which allows for students in these grades to participate weekly in various activities that are too time-consuming or difficult to cover in a normal physical education class.

Religion

The Catholic theme is very prevalent at Clear Water Academy, with a Prayer for the Bishop and decade of the rosary every morning, a prayer before every class, the Angelus before lunchtime, and weekly mass every Friday afternoon. There is a weekly apostolic course for most grades, which involves either some apostolic activity around the city (ex. raking leaves to benefit single, lower-income mothers), a discussion on the Virtue of the Month, or creating a presentation for a younger grade. Also offered is a religion course, where students learn about Catholic church history and teachings, and how to be better Catholics.

Apostolic Work

One of the pillars of Clear Water Academy is Apostolic formation. Clear Water Academy's apostolic program allows students to participate in various charitable activities such as serving the hungry, helping the homeless, and volunteering at the local bottle depot. Clear Water Academy has organized several mission trips to Haiti, the Dominican Republic and Mexico over the past few years. The students' goal on the trips was to paint either a chapel or a church. The students strengthen their relationships with their peers, teachers, and most importantly God. Furthermore, they gain a better understanding of the poverty that the people of a third world country endure and an appreciation for the country and culture which they live in.

References

External links

 Clear Water Academy Homepage

Elementary schools in Calgary
Middle schools in Calgary
High schools in Calgary
Catholic secondary schools in Alberta
Regnum Christi
Educational institutions established in 1994
1994 establishments in Alberta